Mahenge is a town in the Morogoro Region of Tanzania

Places
 Mahenge District, alternative name for Ulanga District, Tanzania
 Mahenge Mountains, a mountain range in Tanzania

People

Family name
 Binilith Mahenge (born 1862), a Tanzanian politician

Given name
 Mahenge Zulu (1965-2019), an African-born, Italian boxer

Other uses
 Mahenge offensive, a military campaign in East Africa in 1917
 , A Belgian cargo ship which sank in 1952